Billbergia violacea is a plant species in the genus Billbergia. This species is native to Bolivia.

Cultivars
 Billbergia 'Koechlii'

References

BSI Cultivar Registry Retrieved 11 October 2009

violacea
Flora of Bolivia